Cocq is a French surname, meaning rooster. Notable people with the surname include:

 Frans Banninck Cocq (1605–1655), 17th century burgemeester
 Fernand Cocq (1861–1940), Belgian politician
 Hendrick Joseph Cornelius Maria de Cocq (1906–1998), Dutch prelate

See also 
 Lecocq

Surnames of French origin